Elchin is a masculine Azerbaijani given name. Notable people with the name include:

Elchin Afandiyev (born 1943), Azerbaijani writer and politician
Elchin Alizade (born 1986), Azerbaijani boxer
Elchin Azizov (born 1975), Azerbaijani opera singer
Elchin Guliyev (born 1967), Azerbaijani politician
Elchin Ismayilov (born 1982), Azerbaijani judoka
Elchin Musaoglu (born 1966), Azerbaijani film director
Elçin Sangu (born 1985), Turkish actress and model 

Azerbaijani masculine given names